Pseuderemias is a genus of lizards of the family Lacertidae. Common names for the genus are false sand lizards or racerunners.

Distribution
Species of this genus are distributed from southeastern Egypt (Gebel Elba region) along coastal regions of the Red Sea in Sudan to Eritrea, eastern Ethiopia, Djibouti, Somalia and northern Kenya. The center of the diversification of this genus is Somalia.

Diagnosis
Pseuderemias are small to medium-sized dorso-laterally compressed lacertids with very narrow snouts. Each nostrils is surrounded by four nasal scales and is not reached by the first supralabial. The upper head shields are smooth, rugose or pitted. The eyes have movable lids. There is no vertebral series of enlarged scales down the middle of the back, the dorsal scales are roughly homogeneous. A collar is present. The ventral scales are smooth and arranged in six to ten longitudinal rows. The toes are strongly compressed and the subdigital lamellae are keeled. The tail is long, up to three times as long as head and body. Femoral pores are present.

The ground colour is greyish or light brown to brownish red, brick red, dark brown or almost black. On the back there are usually some creme or whitish stripes and/or dots which are arranged in longitudinal lines. Some species like P. erythrosticta lack stripes and are spotted with dark dots. Hatchlings are generally more intensely striped than adults.

Habitat and natural history
Only one species (P. mucronata) reaches north to Egypt and inhabits along the Red Sea coastal dunes and sandy plains with fairly good vegetation cover. Other species are distributed in low-lying, arid Somali-Masai Acacia-Commiphora deciduous bushland and semi-desert shrubland vegetation in eastern Africa.

Little is known of the natural history of Pseuderemias species. They are small diurnal, active, terrestrial lacertids that feed on small insects and other arthropods and lay eggs.

Species
Seven species are recognized.
Pseuderemias brenneri  – Brenner's racerunner, Brenner's sand racer
Pseuderemias erythrosticta  – Boulenger's racerunner
Pseuderemias mucronata  – Sinai racerunner, Blanford's sand racer
Pseuderemias savagei (
Pseuderemias septemstriata 
Pseuderemias smithii  – Smith's racerunner, Smith's sand racer
Pseuderemias striatus  – Peters's sand lizard, Peters's sand racer

References

Further reading
Anderson, J. (1898): Zoology of Egypt. Volume First. Reptilia and Batrachia. -  London (B. Quaritch), LVIII + 371 pp.
Baha El Din, S. (2006): "A Guide to the Reptiles and Amphibians of Egypt". The American University in Cairo Press, Cairo - New York.
Blanford, W.T. (1870): Observations on the Geology and Zoology of Abyssinia, made during the Progress of the British Expedition to that Country in 1867-68. - London (MacMillan & Co.), xii + 487 pp. (Description of Pseuderemias mucronata)
Boettger, O. (1883): Die Reptilien und Amphibien von Marokko II. - Abhandlungen der Senckenbergischen Naturforschenden Gesellschaft, 13: 93–146. (Description of the genus Pseuderemias)
Boulenger, G.A. (1892): On some Reptiles collected by Sig. Luigi Robecchi Bricchetti in Somaliland. - Annali del Museo Civico de Storia Naturale di Genova, (2) 12: 5–15. (Description of Pseuderemias erythrosticta)
Boulenger, G.A. (1895): An account of the reptiles and batrachians collected by Dr. A. Donaldson Smith in western Somaliland and the Galla Country. - Proceedings of the Zoological Society of London, 1895: 530–540. (Description of Pseuderemias smithii)
Boulenger, G.A. (1921): [https://archive.org/stream/monographoflacer02boul#page/n3/mode/2up "Monograph of the Lacertidae. Vol. II]". British Museum (Natural History). Department of Zoology. London. 451 pp.
Laurent, R.F.; Gans, C. (1965): Lizards. pp. 25–45 in: Gans, C.; Laurent R.F.; Pandit H.: Notes on a herpetological collection from the Somali Republic. Annales du Musée Royal de l’Afrique Centrale (8vo), Sciences Zoologiques, Tervuren, 134: 1-93.
Parker, H.W. (1942): The Lizards of British Somaliland . - Bulletin of the Museum of Comparative Zoology at Harvard College, 91 (1): 1–101.
Peters, W.C.H. (1869): Über neue Gattungen und neue oder weniger bekannte Arten von Amphibien (Eremias, Dicrodon, Euprepes, Lygosoma, Typhlops, Eryx, Rhynchonyx, Elapomorphus, Achalinus, Coronella, Dromicus, Xenopholis, Anoplodipsas, Spilotes, Tropidonotus). - Monatsberichte der Königlichen Preussischen Akademie der Wissenschaften zu Berlin, 1869: 432–447.
Peters, W.C.H. (1874): Über einige neue Reptilien (Lacerta, Eremias, Diploglossus, Euprepes, Lygosoma, Sepsina, Ablepharus, Simotes, Onychocephalus). - Monatsberichte der Königlichen Preussischen Akademie der Wissenschaften zu Berlin, 1874: 368–377.
Spawls, S.; Howell, K.M.; Drewes, R.C.; Ashe, J. (2002): A Field Guide to the Reptiles of East Africa. - San Diego, San Francisco, New York, Boston, London (Academic Press, Elsevier Science).

 
Lizard genera
Lacertid lizards of Africa
Taxa named by Oskar Boettger